Nevdürr Hanım (1861 - 1927; meaning "the new shine") was a consort of Sultan Murad V of the Ottoman Empire.

Life
Nevdürr was born to Batumi in 1861, daughter of Nakaşvili Rüstem Bey. She was georgian. 

Nevdürr married Murad in 1880 when he was already a prisoner in the Çırağan Palace. She remained childless. After reigning for three months, Murad was deposed on 30 August 1876, due to mental instability and was imprisoned in the Çırağan Palace. Nevdürr was initially sent to Çırağan Palace as Kalfa (servant), but Murad liked her and decided to take her as his new consort.

Nevdürr was widowed at Murad's death in 1904, after which her ordeal in the Çırağan Palace came to an end. After the death of her husband, she was sent to Bursa with the consorts Gevherriz Hanım, Remzşinas Hanım and Filizten Hanım for a few years and her salary was canceled by the Committee of Union and Progress. Afterwards she went to live with her step-daughter Hatice Sultan who requested a salary for Nevdürr many times, but it was never accorded. When Hatice Sultan was exiled in 1924, Nevdürr fell in total poverty. 
She died in 1927 in the Beşiktaş district in Istanbul.

In literature
 Nevdürr is a character in Ayşe Osmanoğlu's historical novel The Gilded Cage on the Bosphorus (2020).

See also
Ikbal (title)
Ottoman Imperial Harem
List of consorts of the Ottoman sultans

References

Sources

1861 births
Year of death unknown
People from Batumi
19th-century consorts of Ottoman sultans